Ophiomyia lantanae is a fly native to the Americas, from the southern US to Brazil but had been introduced also to Australia as biological control agent of Lantana camara in 1914.

Biology
This fly feeds on flowers and fruits of Lantana camara.

References

Agromyzidae
Diptera used as pest control agents
Arthropods of Brazil